Marco Paulo is a masculine Portuguese given name. Notable people with the name include:

Marco Paulo Rebelo Lopes, (born 1976) Angolan international footballer of Portuguese descent
Marco Paulo Faria Lemos, (born 1973) Portuguese footballer
Marco Soares (football), full name Marco Paulo Silva Soares, Cape Verdean footballer
Marco Abreu, full name Marco Paulo Coimbra Abreu, Angolan footballer

See also
Marco (given name)
Paulo
Marcos Paulo

Portuguese masculine given names